The 1955 Arkansas Razorbacks football team represented the University of Arkansas in the Southwest Conference (SWC) during the 1955 college football season. In their first year under head coach Jack Mitchell, the Razorbacks compiled a 5–4–1 record (3–2–1 against SWC opponents), finished in fourth place in the SWC, and outscored all opponents by a combined total of 126 to 114.

Schedule

References

Arkansas
Arkansas Razorbacks football seasons
Arkansas Razorbacks football